This is a list of lighthouses in Saint Helena.

Lighthouses

See also
 Lists of lighthouses and lightvessels

References

External links
 

Saint Helena
Saint Helena
Lighthouses
Transport in Saint Helena
Buildings and structures in Saint Helena